Antonia Forest (26 May 1915 – 28 November 2003) was the pseudonym of Patricia Giulia Caulfield Kate Rubinstein, an English writer of children's novels. She is known for the Marlow series.

Life
Forest was born to part Russian-Jewish and Irish parents on 26 May 1915. She grew up in Hampstead, London, and was educated at South Hampstead High School and University College, London, where she studied journalism. During World War II, she worked at an Army Pay Office.

From 1938 until her death, Forest lived in Bournemouth and Dorset. By the end of 1946, she was a Roman Catholic. Eventually, she called herself "middle-aged, narrow-minded, anti-progressive and proud of it".

Forest was a prolific letter writer, frequently corresponding with her readers and literary figures such as GB Stern. She never married and, for many years, supported herself by renting out part of her house in Bournemouth.

Marlow series

Forest is known for the Marlow series of novels featuring one contemporary generation of the Marlows, an ancient, landed family whose patriarch is a Royal Navy commander (later captain). Among eight children, all six daughters go to Kingscote, a boarding school where the four books named after school "Terms" are set.

‡ "Twins' Form" refers to the school stages of twins Nicola and Lawrie.

The Marlows' world is unusually fully described. The school stories feature the talented protagonists' wide-ranging interests and the strengths and weaknesses of members of their circle.

Forest's books were later noted for their technique in Richmal Crompton's 1965 story William and the Pop Singers: placing characters created in an earlier age, and still are essentially tied to that past time, in a different world several decades later. The same characters who initially recount their childhood experiences of the London Blitz watch Up Pompeii! and make themselves up as punks when they are a few years older. The 1976 book The Attic Term is notable for its use of the teenage character Patrick Merrick to express Forest's opposition to changes in Roman Catholicism after the Second Vatican Council.

Forest indicated she was working on a successor to Run Away Home, but no manuscript was found among her papers after her death in 2003.

Forest also wrote The Player's Boy (1970) and The Players and the Rebels (1971) about the Marlows' ancestors in Shakespeare's time.

Reception

The Thursday Kidnapping (1963) was Forest's only book not about the Marlows and the only one published in the U.S. It was a commended runner-up for the Library Association's Carnegie Medal for the year's best children's book by a British subject. Two modern Marlows books were also commended runners-up, Falconer's Lure for 1957 and Peter's Room for 1961.

Forest's books have received critical praise from Victor Watson, who called her 'the Jane Austen' of children's literature, and from Alison Shell, who has studied Forest's theme of recusant Catholicism. They featured in Lucy Mangan's 2012 memoir of favourite childhood reading; she chose the first Marlow book as one of her top picks for a children's library, saying of the series: 'they are dense and complex books, but among the most fulfilling reads I think a child can have. When I first came across C.S. Lewis's adage, "I read to know that I am not alone", it was the Marlows I thought of'.

Reissues

Years after Forest's books went out of print, they gradually returned to the public eye with a Faber reprint of Autumn Term in 2000. It was followed by Girls Gone By Publishers reprints of Falconer's Lure, Run Away Home, The Marlows and the Traitor, The Ready-Made Family, Peter's Room, and The Thuggery Affair. Girls Gone By reprinted The Player's Boy in 2006, The Players and the Rebels in 2008, and The Thursday Kidnapping in 2009. Since reacquiring the copyright of all Forest's books apart from Autumn Term, Girls Gone By also published new editions of End of Term (2017) and The Cricket Term (2020). They also reprinted The Marlows and the Traitor (2015), Falconer's Lure (2016), Peter's Room (2018), and The Thuggery Affair (2019).

In 2011, Girls Gone By published Spring Term, a continuation of the modern Marlow saga by Sally Hayward.

See also
 
 School story
 Boarding schools in fiction

Notes

References

External links
 Hilary Clare (2006), "School Stories Don't Count: The Neglected Genius of Antonia Forest" in Pat Pinsent (ed.) Out of the Attic
 Collecting Antonia Forest Books

 

1915 births
2003 deaths
English children's writers
English Roman Catholics
Converts to Roman Catholicism from Judaism
English people of Russian-Jewish descent
English people of Irish descent
Alumni of University College London
People educated at South Hampstead High School
People from Hampstead
Writers from Bournemouth
20th-century English novelists
20th-century English women writers
Place of birth missing
Place of death missing
English women novelists
British women children's writers
Writers from London